Ricciaceae are a family of liverworts in order Marchantiales, with two extant genera.

 Riccia
 Ricciocarpos

References 

 
Liverwort families
Taxa named by Ludwig Reichenbach